People's Solution (Spanish: Solución Popular) was an electoral coalition in Peru. At the legislative elections, 8 April 2001, the party won 3.6% of the popular vote and only 1 seat out of 120 in the Congress of the Republic. Its presidential candidate at the elections of the same day, Carlos Boloña Behr, won 1.7% of the vote.  The party didn't take part in the 2006 elections.

Defunct political parties in Peru